The Beat Goes On is an album by American jazz flautist Herbie Mann released on the Atlantic label in 1967. The album features tracks from seven separate sessions recorded in 1964, 1966 and 1967.

Reception

Allmusic noted "The Beat Goes On is a generally funky, groove-oriented soul-jazz effort with strong Latin leanings. ...Jazz purists hated this release, but let them say what they will – this LP is full of highly infectious grooves and makes a great party album".

Track listing
 "No Matter What Shape" (Granville "Sascha" Burland) – 3:25
 "More Rice Than Peas, Please" (Herbie Mann) – 3:30
 "Hey Ho" (Herbie Hancock) – 2:45
 "The Honeydripper" (Joe Liggins) – 2:45
 "The Beat Goes On" (Sonny Bono) – 2:50
 "Swingin' Shepherd Blues" (Kenny Jacobson, Moe Koffman, Rhoda Roberts) – 3:05
 "West African High Life" (Mann) – 2:40
 "Dream Garden" (Dave Pike) – 4:37
 "Soul Montuno" (René Hernández) – 2:58
 "Is Paris Burning?" (Maurice Jarre) – 2:37
Recorded in New York City on April 6, 1964 (track 8), May 6, 1964 (track 9), May 8, 1964 (track 7), September 29, 1966 (tracks 6 & 10), December 15, 1966 (track 4), December 16, 1966 (tracks 1–3) and March 16, 1967 (track 5)

Personnel 
Herbie Mann – flute. alto flute on "Dream Garden" – with various ensembles including:
Clark Terry – trumpet 
King Curtis – tenor saxophone
Roy Ayers, Dave Pike – vibraphone
Don Friedman, Jimmy Wisner, Joe Zawinul – piano
Attila Zoller – guitar
Jack Six, Reggie Workman – bass
Bruno Carr, Bobby Thomas – drums
Willie Bobo – timbales
Carlos "Patato" Valdes – congas, percussion
Tamiko Jones – vocals
Gene Orloff, Jimmy Wisner – arranger, conductor
Technical
Adrian Barber, Phil Iehle, Tom Dowd – recording engineer
Dick Luppi – cover illustration

References 

1967 albums
Herbie Mann albums
Albums produced by Nesuhi Ertegun
Albums produced by Arif Mardin
Atlantic Records albums